Pragya Kapoor née Yadav, is a Swedish model, actress, and producer. She was born in Borgholm and raised in Karlskrona, Sweden. She has trained in acting at the Institute of Advanced Acting and Behavioral Studies.

She married film director and producer Abhishek Kapoor on 4 May 2015. They have two children, Isana and Shamsher.

Career 
Pragya Kapoor is best known for her work in Amole Gupte's Hawaa Hawaai (2014). She has produced Kedarnath (2018) with Ronnie Screwvala, along with Abhishek Kapoor and Abhishek Nayyar as co-producers. She is the co-founder of Guy In The Sky Pictures. In collaboration with Bhushan Kumar's T Series, she was to be producing Sharaabi.

Filmography

References

Further reading

External links

Living people
Year of birth missing (living people)
People from Borgholm Municipality
Swedish female models
Swedish film actresses
Swedish women film producers
Actresses in Hindi cinema
Swedish people of Indian descent
Actresses of Indian descent
Swedish expatriates in India
European actresses in India
21st-century Swedish actresses